Two destroyers of the Imperial Japanese Navy have been named :

See also 
 White Cloud (disambiguation)

Imperial Japanese Navy ship names
Japanese Navy ship names